Belmont is a surname. Notable people with the surname include:

 Alva Belmont (1853–1933), American socialite and suffrage supporter
 Andy Belmont (born 1957), American stock car racer
 August Belmont (1813–1890), American businessman and diplomat
 August Belmont Jr. (1853–1924), American financier and thoroughbred racing enthusiast
 Charles-François de Machault de Belmont (1640–1709), French naval officer, governor general of the French Antilles
 Eduardo Belmont Anderson (born c. 1945), Peruvian billionaire businessman
 François Vachon de Belmont (1645–1732), Roman Catholic bishop
 Joe Belmont, American basketball player and coach
 Joe Belmont (bird impressionist) (1876–1949), stage name of American bird impressionist and singer
 Joseph Belmont (born 1947), Seychellois politician
 Lara Belmont (born 1980), British actress
 Oliver Belmont (1858–1908), American congressman
 Perry Belmont (1851–1947), American politician and diplomat
 Ricardo Belmont, Peruvian TV network owner and politician 
 Robert Belmont (1892–1953), French politician
 Veronica Belmont (born 1982), podcast host and producer

Fictional characters:
 The Belmont family of vampire hunters from the Castlevania series of games which include: Leon, Trevor, Christopher, Simon, Richter, Sonia, Juste, Julius, Victor and Gabriel.